Time in Oman is given by Gulf Standard Time (GST) (UTC+04:00). Oman does not observe daylight saving time.



References

Oman